Madame Sul-Te-Wan (born Nellie Crawford; March 7, 1873 – February 1, 1959) was the first black actress to sign a film contract and be a featured performer. She was an American stage, film and television actress for over 50 years. The daughter of former slaves, she began her career in entertainment touring the East Coast with various theatrical companies and moved to California to become a member of the fledgling film community. She became known as a character actress, appeared in high-profile films such as The Birth of a Nation (1915) and Intolerance (1916), and easily navigated the transition to the sound films.

In 1986, she was inducted into the Black Filmmakers Hall of Fame.

Early life
Nellie Crawford was born in Louisville, Kentucky, US to former slaves Cleon De Londa and Silas Crawford. Her father left the family early in her life, and her mother became a laundress for Louisville stage actresses. Young Nellie became enchanted by watching the young actresses rehearse when she delivered laundry for her mother. When she was older she moved to Cincinnati, Ohio, joined a theatrical company called Three Black Cloaks, and began billing herself as "Creole Nell." She also formed her own theatrical companies and toured the East Coast. After moving to California, Crawford began her film career in uncredited roles in director D. W. Griffith's controversial 1915 drama Birth of a Nation. Crawford  had allegedly written Griffith a letter of introduction after hearing that Griffith was shooting a film in her Kentucky hometown. Griffith had intended that he would play a rich landowner who spits in the face of a woman who slights him. The scene was cut by the censors but Crawford  was hired at $3 a day and this became the first contract for a black woman when she was hired at $25 a week. Sul-Te-Wan had managed to get the role by her extravagant dress which caught Griffith's attention.

In the early 1900s, Crawford  married Robert Reed Conley. They had three sons, but Conley abandoned his family when the third boy was only three weeks old. Two of her sons, Odel and Onest Conley, became actors and appeared in several films. Some of these film featured their mother.

When Crawford began using the stage name "Madame Sul-Te-Wan" is unknown; its first appearance on a cast list is in 1931, as the character of Voodoo Sue in Heaven on Earth.  The origin of its composition is also unknown; she clearly chose its exotic Asiatic-sounding construction to suggest a mixed race ancestry, which allowed her to play East Asian, American Indian, Spanish, African and Negro character roles. To further advance the mystery engendered around her heritage it was sometimes claimed that her father was an Indian Hindu or a Native Hawaiian.

Early film career
Following her roles for Griffith, "Madame Sul-Te-Wan" followed up in 1916 with an uncredited role in the Anita Loos-penned drama The Children Pay with Lillian Gish and, again uncredited, in 1917 with Gish's sister Dorothy in the Edward Morrissey-directed drama Stage Struck.

Throughout the 1910s and 1920s, Sul-Te-Wan would establish herself as a publicly recognizable character actress. In 1918 she appeared (uncredited) in Tarzan of the Apes as Jane's maid, Esmerelda. She appeared uncredited, most often in "Mammy" roles, alongside such popular actors of the silent film era as Tom Mix, Leatrice Joy, Matt Moore, Mildred Harris, Harry Carey, Robert Harron, and Mae Marsh. She appeared uncredited in the 1927 James W. Horne-directed Buster Keaton comedy College, and, uncredited, in the 1929 Erich von Stroheim-directed drama Queen Kelly, starring Gloria Swanson.

Sul-Te-Wan transitioned into the talkie era with relative ease and continued to appear uncredited in high-profile films alongside such prominent film actors as Conrad Nagel, Barbara Stanwyck, Fay Wray, Richard Barthelmess, Jane Wyman, Luise Rainer, Melvyn Douglas, Lucille Ball, Veronica Lake and Claudette Colbert. However, as a black woman in the era of segregation, she was consistently limited to appearing in roles as minor characters who were usually convicts, "native women",  or domestic servants, such as her uncredited role as a "Native Handmaiden" in the 1933 box-office hit King Kong. Despite the motion picture industry's limitations for African-American performers, Sul-Te-Wan worked consistently throughout the 1930s and 1940s.

In 1937, Sul-Te-Wan was cast in her first memorable credited appearance in the role of Tituba in the film Maid of Salem, a dramatic retelling of the events surrounding of the Salem Witch Trials of 1692. The film starred Claudette Colbert, Fred MacMurray, Gale Sondergaard, Pedro de Cordoba, and Louise Dresser and was rather financially successful. Sul-Te-Wan's performance garnered critical praise.

Later career

On September 12, 1953, a banquet was held at the Hollywood Playground Auditorium by motion picture actors and film personalities to honor Sul-Te-Wan. Among its 200  attendees were Louise Beavers, Rex Ingram, Mae Marsh, Eugene Pallette and Maude Eburne.

In 1954 Sul-Te-Wan appeared uncredited in the Otto Preminger directed African-American themed musical drama Carmen Jones opposite Dorothy Dandridge, Harry Belafonte, Diahann Carroll, and Pearl Bailey as Dandridge's grandmother. The film marked a rare departure for Sul-Te-Wan from four decades of predominantly "Mammy" roles. Her pairing with Dandridge spawned the meritless misconception in some that Sul-Te-Wan was Dandridge's actual grandmother; the two women are unrelated.

At age 77, Sul-Te-Wan married for the second time, to German immigrant Anton Ebentheuer. The marriage lasted three years. During the 1950s, while in her 80s, she continued to appear onscreen in a number of well-received films, albeit now mostly in smaller bit parts and often uncredited. Her last screen appearance came in the 1958 Anthony Quinn-directed adventure film The Buccaneer, starring Yul Brynner and Charlton Heston.

Death
On February 1, 1959, Madame Sul-Te-Wan died after suffering a stroke at the age of 85 at the Motion Picture Actors' Home in Woodland Hills, California. She was interred at the Pierce Brothers' Valhalla Memorial Park Cemetery in North Hollywood, Los Angeles County, California.

Legacy and honors
Sul-Te-Wan was inducted in the Black Filmmakers Hall of Fame in 1986.

Quotes
 "We never did discover the origin of her name. No one was bold enough to ask." – Lillian Gish.

Filmography

References

Bibliography
 The Ghost Walks: A Chronological History of Blacks in Show Business 1865–1910 by Henry T. Sampson, Scarecrow Press (Metuchen, New Jersey, 1988) 
 Black Women in America An Historical Encyclopedia. Volumes 1 and 2. Edited by Darlene Clark Hine. 1993, Carlson Publishing Inc., Brooklyn, New York 
 Black Hollywood, Then and Now, NPR, February 16, 2005

External links
 
 

1873 births
1959 deaths
20th-century American actresses
Actresses from Louisville, Kentucky
African-American actresses
American film actresses
American silent film actresses
American stage actresses
American television actresses
Burials at Valhalla Memorial Park Cemetery
20th-century African-American women
20th-century African-American people